Fort Dodge is an unincorporated community in Grandview Township, Ford County, Kansas, United States. As of the 2020 census, the population of the community and nearby areas was 97. Fort Dodge has a post office with ZIP code 67843.

History
From 1865 to 1882, Fort Dodge was an outpost on the Santa Fe Trail. After the fort closed, the site became the Kansas Soldiers' Home in 1890.

Demographics

For statistical purposes, the United States Census Bureau has defined Fort Dodge as a census-designated place (CDP).

2010 census
As of the 2010 United States Census, there were 165 people, 66 households, and 23 families residing in the CDP. The racial makeup of the CDP was 95.2% White, 1.8% African American, 0.6% American Indian, 0.6% from other races, and 1.8% from two or more races. Hispanics and Latinos of any race were 3.0% of the population.

There were 66 households, of which 0.0% had children under the age of 18 living with them, 31.8% were married couples living together, 1.5% had a female householder with no husband present, 1.5% had a male householder with no wife present, and 65.2% were non-families. 46.1% of the population was in group quarters. 65.2% of all households were made up of individuals, and 34.8% had someone living alone who was 65 years of age or older. The average household size was 1.35, and the average family size was 2.00.

The median age in the CDP was 76.6 years. 0.0% of residents were under the age of 18; 0.0% were between the ages of 18 and 24; 3.0% were from 25 to 44; 27.9% were from 45 to 64; and 69.1% were 65 years of age or older. The gender makeup of the CDP was 78.2% male and 21.8% female.

The median income for a household was $23,250, and the median income for a family was $32.045. The per capita income for the CDP was $21,004. About 0.0% of families and 0.0% of the population were below the poverty line, including 0.0% of those under age 18 and 0.0% of those age 65 or over.

Education
The community is served by Dodge City USD 443 public school district.

Notable people
 James H. "Dog" Kelley, mayor of Dodge City from 1877 to 1881; lived in Fort Dodge in his later years.
 Morris S. Tremaine, businessman and politician. He was New York State Comptroller from 1927 to 1941.

References

Further reading

External links
 Ford County maps: Current, Historic - KDOT

Census-designated places in Ford County, Kansas
Census-designated places in Kansas